Alaska Highway News is a weekly newspaper serving Fort St. John, the North Peace River region, and Dawson Creek in northeastern British Columbia, Canada. The paper was founded in 1943 by Margaret Lally "Ma" Murray and has been owned since 2006 by Glacier Media.

History
Ma Murray, a Kansas native and wife of British Columbia politician and publisher George Matheson Murray, had already made a reputation as the firebrand editor of the Bridge River-Lillooet News in Lillooet, British Columbia, among other publications, when the Murrays came to see the Alaska Highway for themselves in 1940. They decided that Fort St. John, then a boomtown populated mostly by United States Army soldiers, was a good place to start a newspaper, and the weekly Alaska Highway News was born in 1943.

Murray became the "best-known, best-loved and also most cordially disliked person in Fort St. John" for her folksy and outspoken editorials, including attacks on the local power and telephone companies, and her solution to a town water shortage:
There has been a terrible waste of water in this small town. ... We sure as hell need to use less if we are going to have this modern convenience. To head off this catastrophe, only flush for No. 2, curtail bathing to the Saturday night tub, go back to the old washrag which could always remove a lot of B.O. if applied often enough. ...

She frequently ended her editorials "...and that's fer damshur!". Ma Murray also coined the Alaska Highway News motto: "We're the only newspaper in the world that gives a tinker's damn about the North Peace."

By the turn of the 21st century, the paper had converted to a daily and ownership had passed to Hollinger Inc., the media empire of Conrad Black. Along with several other small British Columbia dailies, the Alaska Highway News was one of the last Hollinger properties to be sold, to Vancouver-based Glacier Ventures International, later called Glacier Media, in 2006. In 2013, the paper merged with another Glacier Media Group outlet, The Dawson Creek Daily News. The paper serves both the Fort St. John and Dawson Creek areas, as well as surrounding areas, including Fort Nelson. In March 2016 the frequency of the paper was switched to weekly.

See also
List of newspapers in Canada

References

External links
Alaska Highway News

1943 establishments in Canada
Fort St. John, British Columbia
Daily newspapers published in British Columbia
Newspapers established in 1943
Weekly newspapers published in British Columbia